José Jonny Magallón Oliva (born 21 November 1981) is a Mexican former professional footballer who played as a centre-back.

A defender capable of playing as a centre back and full-back, he started his senior career with Guadalajara in 2003. He was eventually sold to Club León in the summer of 2012, helping the team win both tournaments of the 2013–14 season. He had a brief stint with Argentinean club CA Lanús before returning to Mexico's second division team, Mineros de Zacatecas.

A regular Mexico international under Hugo Sánchez, he was called up to participate in the 2007 and 2009 CONCACAF Gold Cups, the 2007 Copa América, and the 2010 FIFA World Cup.

Club career

CD Gualadajara
Magallón made his professional debut with Guadalajara on 16 March 2003, against arch rival Club América which ended in the victory of Guadalajara 2–1. After playing 12 seasons with Chivas, the defender was sold to Club León in June 2012.

Club León
He would go on to win back-to-back tournaments of the 2013–14 Liga MX season, the Apertura 2013 and the Clausura 2014.

Club Atlético Lanús
In the summer of 2016, Magallón was transferred to CA Lanús, where he played for 6 months.

Mineros de Zacatecas
After a brief stint with CA Lanús, Magallon returned to Mexico to play with Mineros de Zacatecas in Mexico's second tier, Ascenso MX.

International career
On 18 January 2007, then national team coach Hugo Sánchez gave Magallón his first call up to the national team, and he played his first game with Mexico on 28 February 2007 against Venezuela, winning 3–1. He was the player with the most minutes at the 2007 CONCACAF Gold Cup and 2007 Copa America. On 7 February he was the protagonist of the friendly match against the United States, he scored both of Mexico's goals in a 2–2 draw, coming back from behind on both occasions. Magallón was called up to the 2010 FIFA World Cup but he did not play in the tournament. Magallon was last called up by Mexico coach José Manuel de la Torre in a friendly match against Serbia on 11 November 2011.

Career statistics

International

International goals
Scores and results list Mexico's goal tally first.

Honours
Guadalajara
Mexican Primera División: Apertura 2006

León
Liga MX: Apertura 2013, Clausura 2014

Mexico
CONCACAF Gold Cup: 2009

References

External links

Player profile - footballdatabase.com

1981 births
Living people
Liga MX players
Argentine Primera División players
C.D. Guadalajara footballers
Club León footballers
Club Atlético Lanús footballers
Footballers from Jalisco
Mexico international footballers
CONCACAF Gold Cup-winning players
2007 CONCACAF Gold Cup players
2007 Copa América players
2009 CONCACAF Gold Cup players
2010 FIFA World Cup players
People from Ocotlán, Jalisco
Mexican expatriate sportspeople in Argentina
Mexican expatriate footballers
Expatriate footballers in Argentina
Association football defenders
Mexican footballers